Teksty z Ulicy is a Polish language academic journal covering modern folklore and focusing on internet memes in recent years. It is referred to as the only Polish scientific forum for this discipline.

The first issue was published in 1995 with a subtitle of Zeszyt folklorystyczny (English: folklore issue), under the editorship of Dionizjusz Czubala and his wife Marianna Oterman-Czubalina, who died the same year.  Dobrosława Wężowicz-Ziółkowska replaced Oterman-Czubalina as co-editor of sporadic annual issues under this subtitle until 2003. Czubala edited the following issue as sole editor, under the same subtitle.

In 2003 Dobrosława became the editor-in-chief and published the 2004 issue under the subtitle Zeszyt kulturoznawczy, with Elena Yazykova as co-editor. The following issues have used the subtitle Zeszyt memetyczny, with Michał Noszczyk as co-editor.

References

External links
 
 Print: 
 Online: 
 Polish scientific forum for memetics

Polish-language journals
Internet in Poland
Publications established in 1995
Academic journals published in Poland